The Roman Catholic Diocese of Puerto Cabello is a diocese located in the city of Puerto Cabello in the Ecclesiastical province of Valencia en Venezuela in Venezuela.

History
On 5 July 1994, John Paul II established the Diocese of Puerto Cabello from Metropolitan Archdiocese of Valencia.

Ordinaries
Ramón Antonio Linares Sandoval (1994.07.05 – 2002.07.16)
Ramón José Viloria Pinzón, S.O.D. (2003.12.05 – 2010.03.13)
Saúl Figueroa Albornoz (2011.04.30 – present)

See also
Roman Catholicism in Venezuela

Sources
 GCatholic.org
 Catholic Hierarchy 

Roman Catholic dioceses in Venezuela
Roman Catholic Ecclesiastical Province of Valencia en Venezuela
Christian organizations established in 1994
Roman Catholic dioceses and prelatures established in the 20th century
1994 establishments in Venezuela
Puerto Cabello